Thomas Sheridan (1719 – 14 August 1788) was an Irish stage actor, an educator, and a major proponent of the elocution movement. He received his M.A. in 1743 from Trinity College in Dublin, and was the godson of Jonathan Swift. He also published a "respelled" dictionary of the English language (1780). He was married (1747) to Frances Chamberlaine. His son was the better known Richard Brinsley Sheridan, while his daughters were also writers - Alicia, a playwright, and Betsy Sheridan a diarist. His work is very noticeable in the writings of Hugh Blair.

Life
Thomas Sheridan was the third son of Dr Thomas Sheridan, an Anglican divine, noted for his close friendship with Jonathan Swift, and his wife Elizabeth McFadden His parents' marriage was notoriously unhappy, and they lived apart much of the time. Thomas attended Westminster School in 1732–1733 but, because of his father's financial problems, he had to finish his initial education in Dublin. In 1739, he earned his BA from Trinity College, Dublin and he went on to earn his MA from Trinity in the early 1740s.  He had his début in acting when he played the title role in Shakespeare's Richard III in Dublin. Soon after, he was noted as the most popular actor in Ireland, being compared often with David Garrick. Not only an actor, but he also wrote The Brave Irishman or Captain O'Blunder which premièred in 1738. He became the manager of the Dublin theatre sometime in the 1740s.

Sheridan left his acting career, although he continued to manage theatre companies and occasionally play bit parts, and moved permanently to England with his family in 1758.  There, his time was spent as a teacher and an educator offering a very successful lecture course. In 1762 Sheridan published Lectures on Elocution. Following that work, he published A Plan of Education (1769), Lectures on the Art of Reading (1775), and A General Dictionary of the English Language (1780). Each of these works was based on some form of an argument taken in an earlier work British Education: Or, The source of the Disorders of Great Britain. Being an Essay towards proving, that the Immorality, Ignorance, and false Taste, which so generally prevail, are the natural and necessary Consequences of the present to defective System of Education. With an attempt to shew, that a revival of the Art of Speaking, and the Study of Our Own Language, might contribute, in a great measure, to the Cure of those Evils (1756).

He lived in London for a number of years before moving to Bath where he founded an academy for the regular instruction of Young Gentlemen in the art of reading and reciting and grammatical knowledge of the English tongue. This venture apparently proving to be unsuccessful, he returned to Dublin and the theatre in 1771. Thomas's son Richard became a partial owner of the Theatre Royal in London in 1776. Two years later Thomas was appointed manager of the theatre, a position he held until 1781.

Beliefs

Sheridan attempted to supply the willing student with a guide to public speaking that was correct, appropriate, and successful. What he actually wanted was a total reform of the British education system, as he saw it disregarding elocution and/or rhetorical delivery. In his work British Education, Sheridan claimed that poor preaching was negatively affecting religion itself.

Sheridan's belief in the valuable effects of strong and correct public speaking was so strong that he was sure studying elocution would help ensure perfection in all of the arts. In British Education, Sheridan writes that preaching from the pulpit "must either effectually support religion against all opposition, or be the principal means of its destruction".

Convinced that English preaching was not done as well as it should be, Sheridan focused on delivery as the principal avenue toward delivering effective messages to an audience: "Before you can persuade a man into any opinion, he must first be convinced that you believe it yourself. This he can never be, unless the tones of voice in which you speak come from the heart, accompanied by corresponding looks, and gestures, which naturally result from a man who speaks in earnest." Sheridan believed that elocution was not restricted to the voice, but embodied the entire person with facial expressions, gestures, posture, and movement.

A Course of Lectures on Elocution 

Published in 1762, this work is considered by many to be Sheridan's most well-known. He established a niche for his insights through decrying the current state of public speaking, as he often did: "so low is the state of elocution amongst us, that a man who is master even of these rudiments of rhetoric, is comparatively considered, as one of excellent delivery". Besides establishing the points previously mentioned, the quote also offers a more narrow definition of rhetoric that seems to be influenced by Peter Ramus.

Central to Sheridan's work was his emphasis on the importance of tones to eloquence. These tones, which correlated with the expressive effects one can give to their speaking, were something Sheridan considered an important part of persuasion. He stated, "The tones expressive of sorrow, lamentation, mirth, joy, hatred, anger, love, &c. are the same in all nations, and consequently can excite emotions in us analogous to those passions, when accompanying words which we do not understand: nay the very tones themselves, independent of words, will produce the same effects".  For Sheridan, how a message was communicated was apparently as important as the message itself. He uses the example of someone saying in a calm demeanour, "My rage is rouzed to a pitch of frenzy, I can not command it: Avoid me, be gone this moment, or I shall tear you to pieces" to show the importance of tones to a message.

Because of this, Sheridan set out to address what he thought John Locke had left out in his treatment of language: "(t)he nobler branch of language, which consists of the signs of internal emotions, was untouched by him as foreign to his purpose".

Selected plays
 Captain O'Blunder

References

Bibliography 

 
Bizzell, Patricia, and Bruce Herzberg, eds.  The Rhetorical Tradition.  2nd ed.  Boston: Bedford/St. Martin's, 2001.
Howell, Wilbur Samuel.  Eighteenth-Century British Logic and Rhetoric.  Princeton, NJ: Princeton University Press, 1971.

External links 

 Encyclopædia Britannica
 Thomas Sheridan (1719–1788) at James Boswell – a Guide
 
 

1719 births
1788 deaths
People from County Cavan
Irish male stage actors
Rhetoric
Rhetoricians
Alumni of Trinity College Dublin
People educated at Westminster School, London
18th-century Irish male actors
Elocutionists
Irish emigrants to Great Britain